Skull Ring is the fourteenth studio album by American rock singer Iggy Pop, released in November 2003. Every track on the album features guest performers. The performers are The Stooges, The Trolls, Green Day, Sum 41, and Peaches.

Background
The performers on most of the tracks on the album are The Trolls, Iggy's band from the Beat 'Em Up era. Members of his original band The Stooges also appear on some of the tracks.

One single, "Little Know It All", was released from the album and featured Sum 41. A music video for the song received significant airplay.. "Little Know It All" also appeared in the video game NASCAR Thunder 2004.

Track listing
 "Little Electric Chair" (featuring The Stooges) (Iggy Pop, Ron Asheton, Scott Asheton) – 4:40
 "Perverts in the Sun" (featuring The Trolls) (Pop, Whitey Kirst, Alex Kirst, Pete Marshall) – 3:18
 "Skull Ring" (featuring The Stooges) (Pop, Asheton, Asheton) – 3:51
 "Superbabe" (featuring The Trolls) (Pop, Kirst, Kirst, Marshall) – 4:09
 "Loser" (featuring The Stooges) (Pop, Asheton, Asheton) – 2:41
 "Private Hell" (featuring Green Day) (Pop, Billie Joe Armstrong) – 2:50
 "Little Know It All" (featuring Sum 41) (Pop, Deryck Whibley, Greig Nori) – 3:33
 "Whatever" (featuring The Trolls) (Pop, Kirst, Kirst, Marshall) – 3:16
 "Dead Rock Star" (featuring The Stooges) (Pop, Asheton, Asheton) – 4:39
 "Rock Show" (featuring Peaches) (Merrill Nisker) – 2:08
 "Here Comes the Summer" (featuring The Trolls) (Pop, Kirst, Kirst, Marshall) – 4:53
 "Motor Inn" (featuring Feedom with Peaches) (Pop, Nisker, Jason Beck, Dave Szigeti) – 4:11
 "Inferiority Complex" (featuring The Trolls) (Pop, Kirst, Kirst, Marshall) – 4:13
 "Supermarket" (featuring Green Day) (Pop, Armstrong) – 3:01
 "'Til Wrong Feels Right" (Pop) – 3:13
 "Blood on Your Cool" (featuring The Trolls) (Pop, Kirst, Kirst, Marshall) – 7:02
 "Nervous Exhaustion" (hidden track featuring The Trolls) (Pop, Kirst, Kirst, Marshall)

 B-sides and alternative versions

 "Motor Inn" (Felix da Housecat's High Octane mix) – 6:12
 "Motor Inn" (Felix da Housecat's High Octane mix instrumental) – 6:12
 "Jose the Arab" (featuring The Trolls; released on Skull Ring EP) – 2:56
 "Ready to Run" (featuring The Trolls; released on Skull Ring EP) – 3:02

Personnel
Iggy Pop – lead vocals, acoustic guitar on track 15
Whitey Kirst – guitar on tracks 2, 4, 8, 11, 13, 16, 17
Pete Marshall – bass on tracks 2, 4, 8, 11, 13, 16, 17
Alex Kirst – drums, percussion on tracks 2, 4, 8, 11, 13, 16, 17
Ron Asheton – guitar, bass on tracks 1, 3, 5, 9
Scott Asheton – drums, percussion on tracks 1, 3, 5, 9
Billie Joe Armstrong – guitar, backing vocals on tracks 6, 14
Mike Dirnt – bass on tracks 6, 14
Tré Cool – drums, percussion on tracks 6, 14
Deryck Whibley – rhythm guitar, vocals on track 7
Dave Baksh – lead guitar on track 7
Jason McCaslin – bass on track 7
Steve Jocz – drums, percussion on track 7
Peaches – vocals, electronics, samples on tracks 10, 12
Steve Keeping – additional drums on tracks 10, 12

Charts

References

External links 

 

Iggy Pop albums
2003 albums
Virgin Records albums
The Stooges